Lasiopetalum rufum is a species of flowering plant in the family Malvaceae and is endemic to the Sydney region of New South Wales. It is a slender, erect or diffuse shrub with linear leaves and small groups of reddish or pinkish flowers.

Description
The upper surface of the leaves is more or less glabrous and the lower surface is covered with woolly white hairs. Flowering occurs in spring, and the fruit is a woolly-hairy capsule  im diameter.

Taxonomy
Lasiiopetalum rufum was first described in 1863 by George Bentham from an unpublished description by Robert Brown who collected the type specimens from near the Georges River. Bentham's description was published in Flora Australiensis. The specific epithet (rufum) means "reddish".

Distribution and habitat
This lasiopetalum grows in heath from the coast to the nearby ranges, mainly between Woy Woy and Menai in the Sydney region.

References

rufum
Malvales of Australia
Flora of New South Wales
Plants described in 1863
Taxa named by George Bentham